African Photography Encounters is a biennial exhibition in Bamako, Mali, held since 1994. The exhibition, featuring exhibits by contemporary African photographers, is spread over several Bamako cultural centers, including the National Museum, the National Library, the Modibo Keïta memorial, and the District Museum. The exhibition also features colloquia and film showings. The most recent biennial took place in 2017.

It is jointly run by the government of Mali and the Institut Français. It has exhibited work by William Kentridge, Samuel Fosso, Pieter Hugo and Zanele Muholi.

2005 – 6th biennial
The 6th biennial took place in November and December 2005, with the theme of "Another World." The prizes awarded were:
 The Seydou Keïta prize was awarded to Rana El Nemr (Egypt) for her work on women in the Cairo subway.
 The Coup de coeur Accor prize was awarded to Mamadou Konaté (Mali)
 The Prix AFAA-Afrique en Création was awarded to Fatoumata Diabaté
 The European Union (Best Reporting Photographer) (Prix de l'Union Européenne) was awarded to Zohra Bensemra (Algeria).
 The Intergovernmental Agency of La Francophonie Award (Prix de l'Agence Intergouvernementale de la Francophonie du Meilleur Jeune) (AIF) was awarded to Ulrich-Rodney Mahoungou (Republic of the Congo)
 The Elan de l'Agence Française de Développement prize was awarded to Uche James-Iroha (Nigeria)
 The Special Jury Prize awarded to Mikhael Subotzky (South Africa)

The jury also honoured Ranjith Kally (South Africa) for his life's work.

2009 – 8th biennial
The biennial included work by Hassan Hajjaj.

The Seydou Keita Prize for Best Photographic Creation was awarded to Uche Okpa-Iroha.

2011 – 9th biennial
The biennial included work by Philippe Bordas and Omar Victor Diop. The Seydo Keita award was given to Pieter Hugo.

2013
The biennial was cancelled because of security concerns.

2015 – 10th biennial
The 10th biennial took place from 31 October to 31 December 2015 and was themed Telling Time. It was directed by Bisi Silva with associate curators Antawan I. Byrd and Yves Chatap.

The biennial included work by Mimi Cherono Ng'ok, Moussa Kalapo (La Métaphore du Temps (the metaphor of time)), Lebohang Kganye, Uche Okpa-Iroha, Nyani Quarmyne (a documentary report on Malian refugees in Mauritania), and Nassim Rouchiche (portraits of sub-Saharan migrants stuck in Algeria).

2017 – 11th biennial
The 11th biennial took place from 2 December 2017 to 31 January 2018.

2019 - 12th biennial 
The 12th biennial took place from 30 November 2019 to the 31st of January 2020. The Artistic director was Bonaventure Soh Bejeng Ndikung with curatorial team including  Kwasi Ohene-Ayeh, Aziza Harmel and Astrid Sokona Lepoultier.

The biennial included work by Christian Nyampeta,  Rahima Gambo Abraham Oghobase, Adeola Olagunju, Eric Gyamfi, and Bouchra Khalili

The Seydou Keïta prize was awarded to Adéọlá Ọlágúnjú (Nigeria) for  the best photographic creation at the 12th edition of Bamako Encounters

See also 
Art biennials in Africa
Addis Foto Fest
Lagos Photo

References

 This article began as a translation of the corresponding article in the French Wikipedia, accessed 26 December 2005.

Bibliography
 Bajorek, J. and E. Haney (2010), 'Eye on Bamako: Conversations on the African Photography Biennial', Theory, Culture and Society, 27 

Bamako
Malian culture
Photography exhibitions
Recurring events established in 1994
1994 in Mali
Art festivals in Africa
Photography in Mali